Georg Carlsson  (April 10, 1892- January 8, 1975) was a Swedish politician. He was a member of the Centre Party. He was a member of the Parliament of Sweden (upper chamber) from 1953.

Members of the Riksdag from the Centre Party (Sweden)
1892 births
1975 deaths
People from Västmanland County
Members of the Första kammaren